Toxoproctis is a genus of tussock moths in the family Erebidae. The genus was erected by Jeremy Daniel Holloway in 1999.

Species
The following species are included in the genus:

References

Lymantriinae
Noctuoidea genera